Anni Bisso (born April 30, 1969 in Tranebjerg) is a Danish sport shooter. She competed in rifle shooting events at the 1996 and 2000 Summer Olympics.

Olympic results

References

1969 births
Living people
ISSF rifle shooters
Danish female sport shooters
Shooters at the 1996 Summer Olympics
Shooters at the 2000 Summer Olympics
Olympic shooters of Denmark
People from Samsø Municipality
Sportspeople from the Central Denmark Region